Warren v Keen is an English Landlord–tenant law case concerning the obligations of both parties.  It is still good law and is well known for Lord Denning's ruling on a tenant's duty to use the let property in a tenant-like manner.

Facts
A property was damaged after pipes froze, and the landlord sought to hold the tenant responsible for dilapidations.

Judgment
The Court below found for the landlord.  The Court of Appeal overturned this and found for the tenant.

Tenant-like manner
Lord Denning's words on using the property in a tenant-like manner, often quoted, were as follows:

In England & Wales, where a tenant is not keeping the property in a tenant-like manner, the landlord may serve a Notice of Eviction under Section 8 of the Housing Act 1988, pleading ground 12.

References

Landlord–tenant law
Lord Denning cases
1953 in British law
1953 in case law